Gaskins is a surname, and may refer to:

 Donald Henry Gaskins (1933-1991), American cannibalistic serial killer, rapist, and thief
 Eric Gaskins (born 1958), American fashion designer
 Nettrice Gaskins (born 1970), American digital artist
 Peadar Gaskins, Irish football player
 Trevor Gaskins (born 1989), Panamaian basketball player

Surnames